Dragon boat racing at the 2012 Asian Beach Games was held in Haiyang, China from 17 June to 19 June 2012.

Medalists

Men

Women

Medal table

Results

Men

200 m
18 June

Heats

Repechages

Finals

500 m
17 June

Heats

Repechages

Finals

3000 m
19 June

Women

200 m
18 June

Heats

Repechages

Finals

500 m
17 June

Heats

Repechages

Finals

3000 m
19 June

References
 Official Website

2012 Asian Beach Games events
Asian Beach Games
2012